George Petrie (April 10, 1866 – September 6, 1947) was an American scholar and educator who played a crucial role in the development of Auburn University.  From 1887 until his retirement in 1942, Petrie held various positions at Auburn, including professor of history and Latin, head of the History Department, and dean of the Graduate School.  Petrie also organized and coached Auburn's first football team in 1892.

Petrie is the first Alabamian to earn a Ph.D. degree. He received his B.A. and M.A. degrees from the University of Virginia in 1887 and a Ph.D. in "history, political economy, and jurisprudence" from Johns Hopkins University in 1890. At Auburn, known until 1892 as the Agricultural and Mechanical College of Alabama, and from 1892 to 1960 as Alabama Polytechnic Institute, Petrie is considered the founder of both the History Department and the Graduate School, as well as the school's athletic program.

Football coach
His time at the University of Virginia inspired Petrie to choose burnt orange and navy blue as the official colors for Auburn's athletic teams. Upon organizing the first Auburn football team in 1892, Petrie arranged for the team to play the University of Georgia team at Piedmont Park in Atlanta, Georgia. Auburn won the game, 10–0, in front of 2,000 spectators. The game inaugurated what is known to college football fans as the Deep South's Oldest Rivalry.

Head coaching record

Auburn Creed
Petrie is perhaps best known to Auburn alumni as the author of the Auburn Creed:

The creed has been a well known symbol of the university ever since Petrie wrote it in 1943.

References

 Jernigan, Mike (2007). Auburn Man: The Life and Times of George Petrie. The Donnell Group.

External links
 

1866 births
1947 deaths
Auburn Tigers football coaches
Auburn University faculty
Johns Hopkins University alumni
University of Virginia alumni
People from Montgomery County, Alabama